Bergwall is a surname. Notable people with the surname include:

 Andreas Bergwall (born 1974), Swedish bandy player
 Marcus Bergwall (born 1971), Swedish bandy player, brother of Andreas
 Sture Bergwall (born 1950), Swede convicted of eight murders but later acquitted of all

See also
 Bergvall